Corybas cerasinus, commonly known as the red helmet orchid, is a species of terrestrial orchid endemic to tropical north Queensland. It has a single bluish green, heart-shaped leaf and a cherry red to dark maroon flower with its curved dorsal sepal obscuring its labellum which has an upturned tip.

Description 
The leaf is bluish green on the upper surface and purplish on the lower side. The labellum is mostly hidden by the dorsal sepal but has edges which turn upwards and a few tiny bristles. Flowering occurs from June to August.

Taxonomy 
Corybas cerasinus was first formally described in 2001 by David Jones and Bruce Gray from a specimen collected on Mount Walker and the description was published in The Orchadian. The specific epithet (cerasinus) is a Latin word meaning "cherry-coloured".

Distribution and habitat
The red helmet orchid grows in forest in colonies with often only a few plants in flower. It is found between Cooktown and the Herbert River and also on Dunk Island.

References 

cerasinus
Endemic orchids of Australia
Orchids of Queensland
Plants described in 2001